Dominique Dupont-Roc (born 26 September 1963 in Sallanches, Haute-Savoie, France) is a French curler, and an eight-time French men's champion.

He participated in the 2002 Winter Olympics where the French men's team finished in tenth place. He also participated in the demonstration curling events at the 1992 Winter Olympics, where the French men's team finished in sixth place.

Teams

References

External links

 Video: 

Living people
1963 births
Sportspeople from Haute-Savoie
French male curlers
French curling champions
Curlers at the 1992 Winter Olympics
Curlers at the 2002 Winter Olympics
Olympic curlers of France